The Women's Team Racing Laser Radial is a sailing event on the Sailing at the Southeast Asian Games programme at the National Sailing Centre.

Schedule
All times are Singapore Standard Time (UTC+08:00)

Results

Preliminary round

Knockout round

References

Women's Team Racing Laser Radial
Laser Radial competitions
Women's sports competitions in Singapore
Team racing competitions
South